Areen Omari (in Arabic; عرين عمري) is a Palestinian actress and producer.

Personal life
Omari lives in Ramallah. She often works with Rashid Masharawi and has an important role in The Other Son by Lorraine Lévy.

Career

Actress

 1994: Curfew by Rashid Masharawi : Houda
 1996: Haïfa by Rashid Masharawi : Samira
 2002:  by Rashid Masharawi : Sana 
 2003: The Olive Harvest by Hanna Elias
 2004: Private (film, 2004) by Saverio Costanzo : Samiah B.
 2005: Waiting by Rashid Masharawi : Bissan Nasar 
 2008: Leila's birthday by Rashid Masharawi : Um Laila 
 2012: The Other Son by Lorraine Lévy : Leïla Al Bezaaz 
 2014: Eyes of a Thief

Producer

 1996: Haïfa (producer executive)
 2002: Ticket to Jerusalem (producer executive)

References

External links

Year of birth missing (living people)
Living people
Place of birth missing (living people)
Palestinian actresses
Palestinian producers
20th-century Palestinian actresses
21st-century Palestinian actresses